Brachyopa panzeri is a European species of hoverflies.

Distribution
Europe.

References

Diptera of Europe
Eristalinae
Insects described in 1945